Missouri Valley Trust Company Historic District, formerly known as the Market Square Historic District, is a national historic district located at St. Joseph, Missouri. The district encompasses six contributing buildings in the central business district of St. Joseph. It developed between about 1859 and the 1860s, and includes representative examples of Renaissance Revival style architecture. The primary building is the Bank of the State of Missouri (1859).

It was listed on the National Register of Historic Places in 1975. The district was subsumed under the St. Joseph's Commerce and Banking Historic District.

References

Individually listed contributing properties to historic districts on the National Register in Missouri
Historic districts on the National Register of Historic Places in Missouri
Renaissance Revival architecture in Missouri
Historic districts in St. Joseph, Missouri
National Register of Historic Places in Buchanan County, Missouri